Concubhair Mac Bruideadha (fl. 1636) was an Irish poet and a man of letters.

A son of Maoilin Óg Mac Bruideadha (died 1602); both of their names occur frequently in the Inchiquin manuscripts, and were closely connected to the Earls of Thomond and their family.

Concubhair’s reputation as a man of letters was acknowledged in 1636, when his approbation and signature were sought by Brother Mícheál Ó Cléirigh for the Annals of the Four Masters. His signature reads: Mac Bruaideadha .i. Concobhar, mac Maoilin óicc, á Chill Caoidhe 7 ó Leitir Mhaoláin.

See also

 Seán Buí Mac Bruideadha, Irish poet, fl. 14th century.
 Diarmuid Mac Bruideadha, died 1563.
 Maoilin Mac Bruideadha, brother of the above, died 1582.
 Maoilin Óg Mac Bruideadha, son of the above, died 1602.
 Tadhg mac Dáire Mac Bruaideadha, c.1570-1652.

External links
  http://www.clarelibrary.ie/eolas/coclare/literature/bardic/clares_bardic_tradition.htm

MacBrody family
Irish-language poets
People from County Clare
16th-century Irish historians
17th-century Irish historians
16th-century Irish writers
17th-century Irish writers
People of Elizabethan Ireland